The German People’s Union – National Association of Danube Swabians in Croatia is a Croatian organization representing the German minority, most obviously the Danube Swabians. Established in 1992, and headquartered in Osijek, the organization is active in a number of fields, most prominently culture.

In the 2003 Croatian parliamentary election, they nominated one Nikola Mak in the election for the special seat for the German minority and won one seat in parliament.

References

External links
 German People’s Union – National Association of Danube Swabians in Croatia 

Political parties of minorities in Croatia
Danube-Swabian people
Croatian people of German descent
Political parties established in 1992
1992 establishments in Croatia
German diaspora political parties